Ma' I Got a Family, also referred to by its full title Ma' I Got a Family, A Gangsta Grillz Special Edition Hosted by DJ Drama on streaming services, is a mixtape by American rapper YoungBoy Never Broke Again. It was released through Never Broke Again and Atlantic Records on October 21, 2022. The mixtape is hosted by the American DJ, DJ Drama as an installment of his Gangsta Grillz mixtape series. The mixtape features guest appearances from rappers Nicki Minaj and Yeat. The mixtape also features production from 808 Mafia, Dmac, D-Roc, Drum Dummie, Mason Wu, Noah Mejia, TnTXD, and Chief Keef. The mixtape was mixed, mastered, recorded, and co-produced by Jason "Cheese" Goldberg and Khris James, two of YoungBoy's in-house engineers. The mixtape was backed by no singles and marks YoungBoy's sixth release of 2022 (fifth solo).

Background
Over a week and a half after YoungBoy's early October Juvenile-influenced 3800 Degrees, through the community tab on YoungBoy's official YouTube channel, YoungBoy announced the release of the mixtape. The announcement was later followed by a teaser where YoungBoy hinted that he plans to release ten projects by the end of 2022.

Just a day prior to the mixtape's release, on October 20, 2022, YoungBoy's twenty-third birthday, the mixtape's release was officially announced by Birdman through his Instagram, similar to the announcement of 3800 Degrees. Hours later, through the Never Broke Again Instagram page, the mixtape's tracklist was unveiled, revealing two features Nicki Minaj and Yeat.

Artwork

The mixtape's artwork pictures YoungBoy Never Broke Again and his current fiancée, Jazlyn MyChelle. With YoungBoy and Jaz are the couple's two children. In the background of the artwork, photos of YoungBoy and his other children can be seen alongside YoungBoy's 100 RIAA certification plaque.

Critical reception

Paul Simpson from AllMusic stated that Ma’ I Got A Family "Far less hard-edged and aggressive than one might expect." He noted that "the mixtape taps into YoungBoy's sentimental side," and that "this is not the release one would expect DJ Drama to be involved with."

Commercial performance
Ma' I Got a Family debuted at number seven on the US Billboard 200 chart, earning 37,000 album-equivalent units (including 402 copies in pure album sales) in its first week. The album also accumulated a total of 52.54 million on-demand streams of the album's songs. The mixtape marks YoungBoy's fifth top-ten entry of 2022.

Track listing

Notes
  signifies an uncredited co-producer

Personnel
Credits adapted from Tidal.

 Jason "Cheese" Goldberg – mastering, mixing, recording (1-19)
 Aubry "Big Juice" Delaine - recording (14)

Charts

References

2022 mixtape albums
Atlantic Records albums
YoungBoy Never Broke Again albums